Moldovan nationality law dates back to June 2, 2000 and has been amended several times, with the latest modifications being made in 2014. It is based on the Constitution of Moldova (articles 17, 18 and 19). It is mainly based on Jus sanguinis.

Dual nationality is allowed, under certain conditions.

Under the law, there are provisions for citizenship to be acquired by:
 Birth
 Recognition
 Adoption
 Recover
 Naturalisation

Citizenship by birth 

You acquire citizenship by birth, if you fulfil any of the following requirements:
 Either of your parents is a citizen of Moldova at the time of your birth
 You are born on the territory of Moldova, and your parents are stateless persons
 You are born on the territory of Moldova, and cannot receive the citizenship of either of your parents
 Any foundling found on the territory of Moldova is considered a citizen unless proven otherwise, until the age of 18

Citizenship by recognition 
You may gain Moldovan citizenship by:

 Being born in the territory of the Republic of Moldova or by having a parent, or grandparent who was born there
 Having resided in Bessarabia, in the North Bukovina, Hertsa Region, and the M.A.S.S.R. before 28 June 1940, or by being a descendant of such a prior resident and having lawful and habitual residence in the Republic of Moldova.
 Having been deported from or having fled the Republic of Moldova since 28 June 1940, or being a descendant of such a deportee or refugee.

Citizenship by naturalisation 
Citizenship may be granted to anyone who has reached the age of 18, and who meets one of the following criteria:
 Has resided in Moldova lawfully and habitually for the last ten years; has been married to a citizen of Moldova for at least three years; or has resided lawfully and habitually for three years with parents or children (including adoptive) who are citizens of Moldova
 Has resided lawfully and habitually for five years before reaching the age of 18
 Is a stateless person or recognised refugee, who has been lawfully and habitually for at least 8 years
In addition they must fulfil the following criteria:
 Knows and observes the provisions of the Moldovan constitution
 Passed an exam in the national language
 Possesses legal sources of income

Dual citizenship
Moldova allows its citizens to hold foreign citizenship in addition to their Moldovan citizenship. Acquiring a foreign citizenship, therefore, does not result in the loss of Moldovan citizenship. Some countries, however, do not permit multiple citizenship e.g. adults who acquired Moldovan and Japanese citizenship by birth must declare, to the latter's Ministry of Justice, before turning 22, which citizenship they want to keep.

Controversy 
On 28 September 2017, a new law allowing individuals to buy their citizenship for a fixed sum took effect. Moldovan pro-Russian president Igor Dodon tried to bring in investments from Russia stating that "The Moldovan passport could allow them to travel in Europe freely." These provisions were repealed by a law that entered into force on September 1, 2020.

References

External links
 Texts of the Moldovan law on citizenship